Falkenberg station could refer to two railway stations in the German state of Brandenburg:

 Falkenberg (Elster) station
 Falkenberg (Mark) station